Female fern may refer to:

 Lady fern, the genus Athyrium
 particularly, the common lady fern (Athyrium filix-femina) 
 a lesser used name of the common brake (Pteridium aquilinum) 
 literal meaning of Thelypteris (also: maiden ferns)